The 2018–19 season was Club América's 6th consecutive season in the Liga MX, and 74th consecutive season in the top-flight of Mexican football. The club will participate in the Liga MX and the Copa MX.

Pre-season and friendlies 
Club América will precede their 2018–19 campaign with a series of friendlies to be contested in the United States. The matches were announced in May 2018.

Squad

2018 Apertura squad

2019 Clausura squad 

 

       

Sources: Club América

Transfers

Summer

In

Winter

In

Out

Competitions

Overview

Torneo Apertura

League table

Apertura Matches

Liguilla

Quarter-finals

Semi-finals

Final

Torneo Clausura

League table

Clausura Matches

Liguilla

Quarter-finals

Semi-finals

Copa MX Clausura 2019

Round of 16

Quarter-finals

Semi-finals

Final

References 

Club América seasons
2018–19 Liga MX season